Dwikozy  is a village in Sandomierz County, Świętokrzyskie Voivodeship, in south-central Poland. It is the seat of the gmina (administrative district) called Gmina Dwikozy.

The village has a population of 2,100. In 1938, a large food processing plant was built in Dwikozy, as part of Polish Central Industrial Area. The plant still exists, producing jams, juices, marmalades and paste.

References

Dwikozy
Radom Governorate
Kielce Voivodeship (1919–1939)